Notable social reformers in India included
Subramanya Bharathiyaar 
Swami Vivekananda
Ishwarchandra Vidyasagar
Debendranath Tagore
Rabindranath Tagore
Mahatma Gandhi
Dwarkanath Ganguly
Gopal Ganesh Agarkar
Ramabai Ranade
Baba Amte
Tarabai Shinde
Javaid Rahi
Pandurang Shastri Athavale
Basavanna
Vinoba Bhave
Gopal Hari Deshmukh
Virchand Gandhi
Narayana Guru
Kazi Nazrul Islam
Acharya Balshastri Jambhekar
Vinayak Damodar Savarkar
Dhondo Keshav Karve
T. K. Madhavan
Ramakrishna Paramhansa
Jyotiba Phule
Savitribai Phule
Pandita Ramabai
Periyar E. V. Ramasamy
Kuriakose Elias Chavara 
Mahadev Govind Ranade
Kirity Roy
Raja Ram Mohan Roy
Begum Rokeya
BR Ambedkar
Dayananda Saraswati
Subhash Chandra Bose
Anurag Chauhan
Sahajanand Saraswati
Prabhat Ranjan Sarkar
Keshub Chandra Sen
Shahu of Kolhapur
Shishunala Sharif
Vitthal Ramji Shinde
Ramalinga Swamigal
Kandukuri Veeresalingam
Ishwar Chandra Vidyasagar
Prabodhankar Thackeray
Ramanuja

References 

Lists of Indian people
I
Indian social reformers